Hossam Jawad Al-Sabah (1948 – 29 May 2021) was a Lebanese actor. He died in a Sidon hospital, suffering from a coma for ten days following a car accident.

Filmography

Film 

Khallet Warde. 2011

Television

Ain El Jawza. 2015
Qiyamat Al Banadiq - Abu Haydar. 2013
Riah El Thawra. 2009
Izz ad-Din al-Qassam - Abdul Malik. 1999

Awards

References

External links

1948 births
2021 deaths
21st-century Lebanese male actors
Lebanese male actors
Lebanese male voice actors
Lebanese male television actors
People from Nabatieh
Road incident deaths in Lebanon